Dendrobium rigidum, commonly known as the smooth tongue orchid or smooth tick orchid, is a species of orchid native to tropical North Queensland and to New Guinea. It is an epiphytic or lithophytic orchid with wiry, hanging stems, fleshy, dark green leaves and flowering stems with between two and seven crowded, cream-coloured, star-shaped flowers often with pink or red on the back. It grows on trees, shrubs and rocks in a paperbark swamps and rainforest.

Description
Flowering occurs sporadically throughout the year.

Taxonomy and naming
Dendrobium rigidum was first formally described in 1810 by Robert Brown and the description was published in Prodromus Florae Novae Hollandiae et Insulae Van Diemen. The specific epithet (rigidum) is a Latin word meaning "stiff", "hard" or "inflexible".

Distribution and habitat
The smooth tongue orchid grows on trees, shrubs and sometimes on rocks in mangroves, paperbark swamps and rainforest in New Guinea, on some Torres Strait Islands and on the Cape York Peninsula as far south as the Russell River.

References 

rigidum
Endemic orchids of Australia
Orchids of Queensland
Plants described in 1810